The Baojun 360 is a 6-seater compact MPV produced by SAIC-GM-Wuling through the Baojun brand. It is positioned below the 730 within Baojun's lineup.

Engines 

References 

360
Front-wheel-drive vehicles
Cars introduced in 2018
Compact MPVs
Cars of China